Winston Abraham (born 29 September 1974) is a former Australian rules footballer. During his AFL career he played as a half forward.

Early career
Abraham played in the Western Australian Sunday Football League for Thornlie and Kelmscott. He then played for Perth in the West Australian Football League, playing only 8 games before being recruited by the Fremantle Football Club

AFL
He was a member of the Fremantle Dockers inaugural squad and played in the Round 1 match against the Richmond Tigers at the MCG. He was noted for his pace and ability to kick freak goals. In 1998 he moved to the Kangaroos, winning the Mark of the Year in his first season, and played in their 1999 Premiership side.

In the first home and away game of 2001, he suffered an injury that would ultimately end his career. In a freak incident, less than a minute after he entered the ground, he ran into a stationary James Hird (who had taken a mark more than a second earlier) and on falling landed awkwardly and damaged his left knee. After injuring the knee he walked off the ground. He was delisted at the end of that season, after it became apparent that surgery to his knee had not been successful.

Coaching
He was assistant coach at the Perth Football Club, his original club, in 2006.

In 2008 Abraham was coach of Western Australian Sunday Football League team Kelmscott.

Playing statistics

|- style="background-color: #EAEAEA"
! scope="row" style="text-align:center" | 1995
|style="text-align:center;"|
| 15 || 12 || 23 || 12 || 86 || 34 || 120 || 29 || 22 || 1.9 || 1.0 || 7.2 || 2.8 || 10.0 || 2.4 || 1.8
|-
! scope="row" style="text-align:center" | 1996
|style="text-align:center;"|
| 15 || 13 || 16 || 19 || 125 || 33 || 158 || 44 || 35 || 1.2 || 1.5 || 9.6 || 2.5 || 12.2 || 3.4 || 2.7
|- style="background:#eaeaea;"
! scope="row" style="text-align:center" | 1997
|style="text-align:center;"|
| 15 || 13 || 16 || 13 || 93 || 37 || 130 || 29 || 14 || 1.2 || 1.0 || 7.2 || 2.8 || 10.0 || 2.2 || 1.1
|-
! scope="row" style="text-align:center" | 1998
|style="text-align:center;"|
| 15 || 25 || 40 || 30 || 234 || 105 || 339 || 56 || 48 || 1.6 || 1.2 || 9.4 || 4.2 || 13.6 || 2.2 || 1.9
|- style="background:#eaeaea;"
! scope="row" style="text-align:center" | 1999
|style="text-align:center;"|
| 15 || 23 || 37 || 23 || 186 || 102 || 288 || 56 || 28 || 1.6 || 1.0 || 8.1 || 4.4 || 12.5 || 2.4 || 1.2
|-
! scope="row" style="text-align:center" | 2000
|style="text-align:center;"|
| 15 || 23 || 27 || 17 || 166 || 86 || 252 || 51 || 37 || 1.2 || 0.7 || 7.2 || 3.7 || 11.0 || 2.2 || 1.6
|- style="background:#eaeaea;"
! scope="row" style="text-align:center" | 2001
|style="text-align:center;"|
| 15 || 1 || 0 || 0 || 0 || 0 || 0 || 0 || 0 || 0.0 || 0.0 || 0.0 || 0.0 || 0.0 || 0.0 || 0.0
|- class="sortbottom"
! colspan=3| Career
! 110
! 159
! 114
! 890
! 397
! 1287
! 265
! 184
! 1.4
! 1.0
! 8.1
! 3.6
! 11.7
! 2.4
! 1.7
|}

References

External links

Living people
Indigenous Australian players of Australian rules football
1974 births
Fremantle Football Club players
North Melbourne Football Club players
North Melbourne Football Club Premiership players
Western Australian State of Origin players
People from Narrogin, Western Australia
Perth Football Club players
Australian rules footballers from Western Australia
One-time VFL/AFL Premiership players